There are 214 hospitals in Zimbabwe as of 2015. Of that total, which does not include smaller clinics, 120 are government hospitals run by the Ministry of Health and Child Care, 66 are mission hospitals, and the remaining 32 are privately operated. The government hospital system includes six central hospitals, eight provincial hospitals, and 63 district-level hospitals, with the rest being rural hospitals. The following list is sorted by province.

Bulawayo 
Bulawayo Central Hospital
Hillside Hospital
Ingutsheni Hospital
Lady Rodwell Maternity Hospital
Mater Dei Hospital
Mpilo Central Hospital
Nervous Disorders Hospital
Richard Morris Hospital
Robbie Gibson Hospital
St Francis Hospital
Thorngrove Isolation Hospital
Melpolha Hospital

Harare 
Arcadia Medical Centre
The Avenues Clinic
Baines Avenue Clinic
Baines Intercare Medical Centre
Beatrice Road Infectious Diseases Hospital
Belvedere Maternity Hospital
Belvedere Medical Centre
Citimed Chitungwiza Hospital, Chitungwiza
Corporate 24 Medical Centre
Dandaro Clinic
Diagnostic Heart Center
Harare Central Hospital
Harare Maternity Hospital
Highfield Poly Clinic
Marlborough Medical Centre
Mbuya Docars Hospital
Med24 Medical Centre
Metropolitan Clinic
Michael Gelfand Clinic
Montagu Clinic
New Cranborne Maternity Clinic
Oncocare Cancer Treatment Centre
Parirenyatwa Hospital
Queen of Peace Clinic
Rock Foundation Medical Center
Sekuru Kaguvi Hospital
St Anne's Hospital
Suburban Medical Center
Trauma Centre & Hospital, Belgravia, Harare
West End Clinic
West End Hospital
Wilkins Infectious Diseases Hospital

Manicaland 
 Avila Mission Hospital
   Birchenough bridge hospital
 Bonda Mission Hospital
 Chikore Hospital
 Chipinge District Hospital
 Elim Mission Hospital
 Hauna Hospital
 Mount Melleray Mission Hospital
 Mount Selinda Hospital
 Murambi Hospital
 Murambinda Mission Hospital
 Mutambara Mission Hospital
 Mutare Provincial Hospital
 Nyanga District hospital
 Regina Coeli Mission Hospital
 Rusape General Hospital
 Rusitu Mission Hospital
St. Peter's Mission Hospital, Checheche

Mashonaland Central
 Bindura Provincial Hospital, Bindura District
 Chimhanda District Hospital
 Chitsungo Mission Hospital, Mbire District
 Concession District Hospital
 Guruve Hospital
 Howard Hospital
 Karanda Mission Hospital, Mount Darwin District
Madziwa Hospital, Shamva District
Mary Mount Mission Hospital, Rushinga District
Mount Darwin District Hospital, Mount Darwin District
 Mvurwi Hospital, Mazowe District
 Nhowe Hospital
 PSMI Medical Clinic, Bindura
 Shamva Hospital, Shamva District
 Shashi Private Hospital, Bindura
St Albert's Mission Hospital

Mashonaland West 
Banket District Hospital
Chegutu District Hospital
Chidamoyo Mission Hospital
Chinhoyi Provincial Hospital
Darwendale Rural Hospital
Father O'Hea Memorial Hospital
Kadoma General Hospital
Kariba District Hospital
Karoi District Hospital
Magunje Rural Hospital
Mutorashanga Rural Hospital
Norton General Hospital
Raffingora Rural Hospital
Sanyati Baptist Hospital
St Michael's Hospital
Zvimba Rural Hospital

Masvingo 
Alheit Hospital, Gutu
Bondolfi Hospital, Masvingo
Chiredzi District Hospital, Chiredzi
Chivi District Hospital, Chivi
Dewure Clinic, Gutu
Driefontein Hospital, Mvuma
Gutu District Hospital, Mpandawana
Gutu Mission Hospital, Gutu
Mashoko Hospital, Bikita
Masvingo General Hospital, Masvingo
Morgenster Mission Hospital, Masvingo
Mutero Mission Clinic, Gutu
Mwenezi District Hospital, Mwenezi
Ndanga District Hospital, Zaka
Nemanwa Clinic, Masvingo
Ngomahuru Psychiatric Hospital
Silveira Mission Hospital, Bikita
St Antony's Musiso Mission Hospital, Zaka

Matabeleland North 
Binga District Hospital
Dakamela Rural District Hospital
Lukosi Hospital
Hwange Colliery Hospital
Hwange Medical Centre
Mbuma Mission Hospital
Nkayi Rural District Hospital
St Luke's Hospital
St Mary's Hospital
St Patrick's Hospital
Tsholotsho District Hospital
Victoria Falls Hospital

Matabeleland South 
Beitbridge District Hospital
Esigodini District Hospital
Filabusi District Hospital
Gwanda Provincial Hospital
Kezi rural Hospital
Manama Mission Hospital
Maphisa District Hospital
Mtshabezi Mission Hospital
Plumtree District Hospital
St Anne's Mission Hospital, Brunapeg
Tshelanyemba Mission Hospital

Midlands 
Clay Bank Group of Hospitals
Gokwe District Hospital
Gweru Provincial Hospital
Kwekwe General Hospital, Kwekwe
Mnene Hospital
St Gerald Chaya General Hospital
Shurugwi District Hospital
Zvishavane District Hospital
Zvamavande Rural Hospital
St Theresa Hama Rural Hospital
Muvonde Hospital Driefontein 
Midlands Private Hospital 
Bethel Clinic 
University Clinics

Mashonaland East  
All Souls Mission Hospital
Borrowdale Trust Hospital
Chivhu General Hospital
Kotwa Hospital
Mahusekwa Hospital
Makumbi Hospital
Marondera Provincial Hospital
Mutawatawa General Hospital
Mutoko Hospital
Nhowe Mission Hospital
Nyadire Mission Hospital
Sadza General Hospital
Wedza District hospital
Mount St Mary's mission hospital
Gwirambira Gynaecologist Hospital
Chitungwiza Central hospital

References

Zimbabwe
 
Hospitals
Zimbabwe